Jack McDonald (September 17, 1880 – 1962) was an American actor of the silent era. He appeared in more than 70 films between 1912 and 1930. He was born in San Francisco, California.

Partial filmography

 Shotgun Jones (1914)
 A Just Punishment (1914)
 Chip of the Flying U (1914)
 Rebecca of Sunnybrook Farm (1917)
 One Touch of Sin (1917)
 The Girl of My Dreams (1918)
 Better Times (1919)
 The Last of the Mohicans (1920)
 Ladies Must Live (1921)
 The Big Punch (1921)
 The Bait (1921)
 Singing River (1921)
 The World's a Stage (1922)
 Main Street (1923)
 Cameo Kirby (1923)
 The Circus Cowboy (1924)
 Against All Odds (1924)
 Greed (1924)
 Don Q, Son of Zorro (1925)
 Champion of Lost Causes (1925)
 The Interferin' Gent (1927)
 The Dove (1927)
 The Phantom City (1928)
 The Whip (1928)
 Show Boat (1929)
 The Ship from Shanghai (1930)
 Big Money (1930)

References

External links

1880 births
1962 deaths
American male film actors
American male silent film actors
Male actors from California
20th-century American male actors